AerianTur-M was an airline based in Chişinău, Moldova, which operated passenger and cargo charter services to the Middle East out of its base at Chişinău International Airport. The company was founded in 1996 and ceased to exist in 2007.

Accidents and incidents

On January 9, 2007, 34 people were killed when an Antonov An-26 airliner crashed while attempting to land at Balad, Iraq. Officials say the accident was caused by fog, but witnesses and the Islamic Army in Iraq say it was shot down.

Fleet
The AerianTur-M fleet included the following aircraft at March 2007:
1 Antonov An-12
2 Antonov An-26

References

Defunct airlines of Moldova
Airlines established in 1996
Airlines disestablished in 2007
Defunct cargo airlines
Cargo airlines of Moldova